Cássio Alessandro de Souza (born 8 July 1986), simply known as Cássio, is a Brazilian footballer who plays for Avaí as a central defender.

Club career
Born in Porto Alegre, Rio Grande do Sul, Cássio was signed by RS Futebol in December 2004 along with his twin brother Rafael. They signed a 5-year contract. In March 2005 they were loaned to Juventude in 3-year contract. Cássio made his Brazilian Série A debut on 26 October 2006. In June 2007 he was loaned to Avaí in 2-year deal, which Rafael already arrived in March. After a season with Avaí at Série B, he was signed by Traffic Group as an investment (through subsidiary Desportivo Brasil) and loaned back to Avaí in -year deal. In 2008 the team finished as the third and promoted. Traffic Group then loaned him to Série A side Fluminense, another club partner, in 2-year deal. He only played 15 Série A games in 2 seasons. However, he also played in 2009 Copa Sudamericana final first leg.

In February 2011 he returned to Avaí in 2-year deal as his twin brother transferred to Europe. It was reported that Avaí held some rights and Traffic held 40% before the transaction.

Honours
Fluminense
Campeonato Brasileiro Série A: 2010

References

External links
 Futpedia (Profile 2) 
 
  
 
 
 Avaí Profile 
 Profile at Traffic

1986 births
Living people
Footballers from Porto Alegre
Brazilian footballers
Association football central defenders
Campeonato Brasileiro Série A players
Campeonato Brasileiro Série B players
Esporte Clube Juventude players
Avaí FC players
Desportivo Brasil players
Fluminense FC players
Guarani FC players
Fortaleza Esporte Clube players
Agremiação Sportiva Arapiraquense players
Comercial Futebol Clube (Ribeirão Preto) players